The Connor Palace, also known as the Palace Theatre and historically as the RKO Palace, is a theater located at 1615 Euclid Avenue in Downtown Cleveland, Ohio, part of Playhouse Square.  The theater opened in 1922, as Keith's Palace Theatre after B. F. Keith, founder of the Keith-Albee chain of vaudeville and movie theaters.   It was designed by the Chicago architectural firm of Rapp and Rapp in the French Renaissance style, and originally housed live two-a-day vaudeville shows.  The $2 million theater opened in the Keith Building on November 6, 1922, seating 3,100.  The interior featured Carrara marble and 154 crystal chandeliers, and the main lobby, dubbed the "Great Hall," was decorated with over 30 paintings.

The advent of the motion-picture age led to the gradual replacement of the vaudeville acts with movies, although vaudeville maintained a presence at the theater until the 1950s. The Palace was subsequently transformed for the presentation of widescreen Cinerama, which required the removal of 1,800 seats.  On July 20, 1969, the theater closed because of air-conditioning trouble, and remained closed due to financial difficulty.  In November 1973, the Playhouse Square Foundation obtained the lease for the Palace, and began producing cabaret shows in the partially reopened theater to attract attention to its efforts to restore Playhouse Square.  In 1978, the theater was added to the National Register of Historic Places, along with the rest of the historic Playhouse Square theaters.

After a $36.4 million renovation project, the Palace completely reopened in 1988 with 2,714 seats, making it the second-largest theater in Playhouse Square.

The Palace was renamed the Connor Palace in 2014 to recognize a donation of nine million dollars to the Playhouse Square capital campaign by the Connor Family of Hunting Valley, Ohio.

George Burns and Gracie Allen were married on the stage of the Palace Theatre by a justice of the peace in 1926.

References

"Amazing facts and figures" Playhouse Square Center.  2003–2005.  Accessed December 3, 2006.
"The Keith Building"  Emporis.  2006.  Accessed December 3, 2006.

Theatres in Cleveland
National Register of Historic Places in Cleveland, Ohio
Theatres on the National Register of Historic Places in Ohio
Cinemas and movie theaters in Ohio
Movie palaces
Cinema of Cleveland
Historic district contributing properties in Ohio
Theatres completed in 1922